Adonis is a hero in Greek mythology.

Adonis may also refer to:

Places
 Adonis, Missouri, USA
 Adonis, West Virginia, USA
 Adonis River or Abraham River, a river in Lebanon
 2101 Adonis, a near-Earth asteroid

People with the name
 Adonis (musician), house music pioneer
 Adunis (born 1930), Syrian poet
 ADONXS, Slovak singer-songwriter

Surnamed
 Adrian Adonis or Keith Franke (1954–1988), American professional wrestler
 Andrew Adonis, Baron Adonis (born 1963), British politician
 Bernard Adonis, a member of the National Assembly of Seychelles
 Joe Adonis (1902–1971), New York mobster
 Neil Adonis (born 1969), South African baseball player

Given named
 Adonis Alexander (born 1996), American football player
 Adonis Medina (born 1996), Dominican baseball player
 Adonis Stevenson (born 1977), Haitian-Canadian professional boxer

Fictional characters
 Adonis "Donnie" Creed, protagonist of the film Creed and its sequel
 Adonis, a fictional character from Dyosa
 Adonis Otogari, singer from Ensemble Stars!
 Adonis, a minor character in the Teen Titans animated series

Transportation
 , a US Navy ship name
 , a United States Navy landing craft repair ship 
 , a British Royal Navy ship name
 , a British Royal Navy schooner
 Adonis class schooners, a class of Royal Navy vessels
 , a wooden brigantine built at Jervis Bay, New South Wales

Technology
 ADONIS (software), a business process analysis tool
 KL-7 or ADONIS, a cipher machine
 ADONIS, an adaptive optics system on the ESO 3.6 m Telescope

Biology
 Adonis (plant), a genus in the plant family Ranunculaceae

Species called adonis
 Acanthicus adonis (A. adonis), a species of catfish
 Ancistrobasis adonis (A. adonis), a species of sea snail
 Asaphodes adonis (A. adonis), a species of moth
 Astrophanes adonis (A. adonis), a species of beefly
 Atheniella adonis (A. adonis), a species of mushroom
 Brettus adonis (B. adonis), a species of spider
 Carinodrillia adonis (C. adonis), a species of sea snail
 Chrysoritis adonis (C. adonis), a species of butterfly
 Adonis tetra (L. adonis), a species of fish
 Macaria adonis (M. adonis), a species of moth
 Macrocneme adonis (M. adonis), a species of moth
 Mahatha adonis (M. adnois), a species of crab
 Micrixalus adonis (M. adonis), a species of frog
 Morpho adonis (M. adonis), a species of butterfly
 Mycena adonis (M. adonis), a species of fungus
 Phanaeus adonis (P. adonis), a species of beetle
 Psaltoda adonis (P. adonis), a species of cicada
 Suillellus adonis (S. adonis), a species of fish

Other uses
 Adonis (musical), an 1884 burlesque musical
 Adonis (cocktail), a cocktail named after the musical
 Marché Adonis, a grocery store chain in Quebec and Ontario, Canada

See also

 Adonaïs, an 1821 elegy written by Percy Shelley
 Adonis Complex, a muscle dysmorphia
 
 
 Adoni (disambiguation), for the singular of Adonis
Andonis